This page gathers the results of elections in Basilicata.

Regional elections

Latest regional election

In the latest regional election, which took place on 24 March 2019, Vito Bardi of Forza Italia was elected president, ending 24 years of dominance by the centre-left coalition. The League, which fielded candidates for the first time in the region, was the largest party.

List of previous regional elections
1970 Basilicata regional election
1975 Basilicata regional election
1980 Basilicata regional election
1985 Basilicata regional election
1990 Basilicata regional election
1995 Basilicata regional election
2000 Basilicata regional election
2010 Basilicata regional election
2013 Basilicata regional election

 
Politics of Basilicata